She is the first studio album by French-Belgian singer Viktor Lazlo.

The album consists of several original jazz pop compositions and includes two cover versions, the first one being Rita Hayworth's Put the Blame on Mame and a French version of the Julie London song Cry Me a River, entitled Pleurer Des Rivieres. The song was successful on the French single charts peaking at No. 27.

Seven songs were eventually released as a single off the album: Backdoorman, Last Call For An Angel, Loser and Sweet, Soft'N'Lazy, which although it never charted anywhere became quite successful. Another single, Canoë Rose, however was successful in Belgium, peaking at No. 33 on the single charts, and in France, peaking at No. 14. The song Slow Motion was later added to the CD version of the album and released as a single too, but was not included on the original album.

The album became an overnight success, and fell just short of platinum in Belgium, where it was released as a Mini LP. It went on to sell over 100,000 copies in Germany and 60,000 in Japan.

Lazlo presented songs off this album on various TV shows, such as the single Loser on the Michael Schanze Show in September 1986.

Track listing

Charts

Album

Single releases

References

 
 

1985 debut albums
Viktor Lazlo albums
Polydor Records albums